Baron Birkett, of Ulverston in the County Palatine of Lancaster, is a hereditary title in the Peerage of the United Kingdom. It was created on 31 January 1958 for the prominent lawyer Sir Norman Birkett. He was one of the British judges at the Nuremberg Trials who later served as a Lord Justice of Appeal before becoming a Law Lord.

On 3 April 2015, the title devolved upon Norman Birkett's grandson who became the third Baron, succeeding his father.

Barons Birkett (1958)
William Norman Birkett, 1st Baron Birkett (1883–1962)
Michael Birkett, 2nd Baron Birkett (1929–2015)
Thomas Birkett, 3rd Baron Birkett (b. 1982)

There is no heir to the title.

Notes

References
Kidd, Charles, Williamson, David (editors). Debrett's Peerage and Baronetage (1990 edition). New York: St Martin's Press, 1990

Baronies in the Peerage of the United Kingdom
Noble titles created in 1958
Noble titles created for UK MPs